L'arma (released in English as The Gun and on home video as Sniper) is a 1978 Italian film. It stars  Claudia Cardinale and Stefano Satta Flores, and was directed by Pasquale Squitieri.

Cast
Stefano Satta Flores: Luigi
Claudia Cardinale: Marta
Benedetta Fantoli:	Rossana
Clara Colosimo: cantante

References

External links

1978 films
Italian crime drama films
1970s Italian-language films
Films directed by Pasquale Squitieri
1970s Italian films